Susan Cunningham may refer to:
 Susan M. Cunningham, Canadian geologist
 Susan Jane Cunningham (1842–1921), American mathematician
 Susan Cunningham (Coronation Street), a character on the soap opera Coronation Street